Charles Cyril Lemprière (19 April 1870 – 24 January 1939) was an English professional rugby league footballer who played in the 1890s and 1900s. From about 1899 he was a schoolmaster, establishing a prep school for boys at Harrogate which moved to Moor Monkton, near York, in 1902. He retired in 1922.

Background
Lemprière was born in Hull, East Riding of Yorkshire, the eldest son of Captain Percy Reid Lemprière, RA, younger brother of Major-General Arthur Reid Lempriere. His grandfather was born in Jersey. He was educated in Worcester and at Radley College before attending the University of Oxford, earning honours in Classical Moderations, 1891. In about 1899 he founded the Carteret School in Harrogate which, in 1902, moved to The Red House, Moor Monkton, near York. Initially he rented the premises from the Slingsby family of Scriven but, in 1916, he purchased the house and land adjacent. He believed the rural location was ideal for preparatory schoolboys, providing them with a healthy environment and space for outside activity. He included classics and science on the curriculum while also encouraging practical skills such as woodwork and gardening. The boys were involved in the running of a school farm which sold provisions to the school kitchen. In 1922 he retired but maintained a close contact with the school. His death aged 68 was registered in Ely district, Cambridgeshire.

County honours
Cyril Lemprière won a cap for Yorkshire (alongside Albert Goldthorpe) in the victory over Cheshire during the 1898–99 season.

References

External links
 (archived by web.archive.org) Stats → Past Players →  L at hullfc.com
 (archived by web.archive.org) Statistics at hullfc.com
 Red House Estate History Pages

1870 births
1939 deaths
English rugby league players
Founders of British schools and colleges
Hull F.C. players
Rugby league wingers
Rugby league players from Kingston upon Hull
Yorkshire rugby league team players